Charsfield is a small Suffolk village of 250 residents,  from Wickham Market,  from Woodbridge and  from Ipswich and is located near the villages of Debach and Dallinghoo. A civil parish in East Anglia, Charsfield was famously used as one of the key locations in the 1974 film Akenfield, based loosely upon the book  Akenfield: Portrait of an English Village by Ronald Blythe (1969). Charsfield hosted the first Greenbelt festival - an annual festival of arts, faith and justice - on a pig farm just outside the village over the August 1974 bank holiday weekend.

Local facilities
Charsfield village hall
Baptist Chapel
Charsfield Primary School (linked to St Peter's church); famous alumni of the school include Charlotte Greig, a British novelist, singer, and songwriter.
Charsfield recreation ground
Garage
St Peter's Church (Church of England parish church)

References

External links

Charsfield village web site
New Charsfield Village Hall Web site
Charsfield School Website
GENUKI
Tourist Information
CEVCP Admisisons information

Villages in Suffolk
Civil parishes in Suffolk